Marina Vladimirovna Ovsyannikova ((); born 19 June 1978) is a Russian journalist who was employed on the Channel One Russia TV channel. She worked for Russia's main evening newscast Vremya on Channel One since the beginning of the 2000s, later describing her role as "producing Kremlin propaganda". 

In 2022, she interrupted a broadcast of Vremya to protest against the Russian invasion of Ukraine, which made international news headlines. She was arrested, held without access to her lawyer, fined 30,000 rubles (365 dollars at the time), and later released. As of early October 2022, she is wanted by the Russian justice system after escaping her pre-trial house arrest; her lawyer says that she fled to Europe. In February 2023, it was revealed she had fled to Paris, France with her daughter.

Early life and career 
Ovsyannikova was born on 19 June 1978 in Odessa, Ukrainian SSR, Soviet Union. Her mother is Russian, and her father is Ukrainian. She lived with her mother in Grozny until the start of the Chechen War, but then they moved to Krasnodar. As a child, she practiced swimming and artistic gymnastics. Her swimming team won the university level Krasnodar championship competitions.

Ovsyannikova graduated from the Kuban State University and later from the Russian Presidential Academy of National Economy and Public Administration (RANEPA). She worked for the All-Russia State Television and Radio Broadcasting Company (VGTRK). Since 1997, she was a journalist and news presenter for the "Kuban" TV channel (a regional subsidiary of VGTRK), and a favorite of its head Vladimir Runov, who is claimed to have helped her enter RANEPA. 

In 2003, after moving to Moscow, she was hired by Channel One Russia. Politico wrote: "Since 2003, her job was to watch Western news streams and press conferences, and  collect excerpts that made the West look bad and Russia look good". The Telegraph described Ovsyannikova during her time at Channel One as a "state mouthpiece" and "the flesh and blood of the Kremlin's propaganda machine". Ovsyannikova retroactively described herself as "having spent many years producing Kremlin propaganda" while working for Channel One.

Anti-war protests 

Ovsyannikova initially supported Putin, but images of the war in Ukraine brought back memories of the war she experienced as a child in Chechnya. She had planned to protest near the Kremlin, but later decided it was not very useful.

On 14 March 2022, during a live broadcast related to the Russian invasion of Ukraine on the evening news programme Vremya, which had millions of viewers, she appeared behind the news anchor, Ekaterina Andreeva, carrying a poster stating in a mix of Russian and English:

Ovsyannikova shouted:

After a few seconds, the broadcast cut away to a recorded segment. The recording of the news program was not available for download, which is uncommon for this TV channel. The protest was unusual as the state-operated program does not deviate from the Kremlin line of a "special military operation", and viewers had previously not been told that the Russian invasion of Ukraine was a war.

Pre-recorded message
After Ovsyannikova's on-air protest, Russian human rights group OVD-Info posted a video she had pre-recorded on Telegram. In the video, she stated that she was "ashamed of working for Kremlin propaganda":

Reactions 

Clips of Ovsyannikova's protest were widely shared around the world and attracted substantial global media coverage.

Ukrainian president Volodymyr Zelenskyy thanked Ovsyannikova during one of his broadcasts. French president Emmanuel Macron offered Ovsyannikova protection at the French embassy or through asylum. Russian government spokesman Dmitry Peskov referred to her protest as "hooliganism".

Russian opposition politician Lev Shlosberg said, "Five seconds of truth can wash away the dirt of weeks of propaganda." Russian opposition politician Ilya Yashin described Ovsyannikova as a "hero of Russia". The detained Kremlin critic Alexei Navalny lauded Ovsyannikova for her defiance during his final statement in court.

The BBC reported that Ovsyannikova's protest had drawn attention to a gradual stream of resignations from Russian state-run TV, with three others emerging within hours. 

Kirill Kleimyonov, head of Channel One Russia's news division, accused her of being a "British spy" and said she called the British embassy prior to the onstage protest. The UK Foreign Office said there was no contact prior to the on-screen protest.

Persecutions and activism 
Ovsyannikova was detained and taken to Ostankino police station. Her lawyer was not able to contact or even locate her for more than 12 hours. The morning after the broadcast, her whereabouts were still unknown. It was reported Ovsyannikova may face up to 15 years in prison under Russia's disinformation laws about the Ukrainian invasion.

Later on 15 March, the Twitter account of Kevin Rothrock, an editor at Meduza, posted a picture showing Ovsyannikova with Anton Gashinsky, a human rights lawyer, in court. For the video posted on Telegram, Ovsyannikova was charged with organizing an unauthorized public event and fined 30,000 rubles ($280, £200 or €255). Russian state news agency TASS reported that Russia's Investigative Committee was also investigating Ovsyannikova for the on-air protest on charges of publicly spreading "false information" about Russia's invasion of Ukraine. Under a new law passed on 4 March, she could be prosecuted for calling the invasion of Ukraine a war instead of the government's euphemism "special military operation" and sentenced to up to 15 years in prison.

On 17 March, Ovsyannikova quit her job on Channel One Russia. She stated that she rejected asylum in France, and was to stay in Russia with her children.

It was announced on 11 April 2022, that Ovsyannikova had accepted, with immediate effect, work as a freelance correspondent for Axel Springer SE's German newspaper Die Welt, covering Russia and Ukraine. Shortly after she moved to Berlin, Germany, leaving her children behind in Russia as her ex-husband did not give her permission to take the children out of the country.

On 25 May 2022, during the annual Oslo Freedom Forum in Oslo, Norway, Ovsyannikova received the Václav Havel Prize for Creative Dissent. This prize is given to honor "those who, with bravery and ingenuity, unmask the lies of dictatorship, and who put forth work that exemplifies tremendous courage and creativity".

Between 27 and 31 May 2022, Ovsyannikova visited Ukraine as a freelance correspondent for Die Welt. The visit caused public uproar, which forced Die Welt to abort the visit and evacuate Ovsyannikova from the country.

After her contract with Die Welt expired, Ovsyannikova returned to Russia. His soldiers are fascists. 352 children died. How many more should die for you to stop?" Two days later, she was arrested and later released. On 9 August, a criminal case was started against her due to this event where she was charged with discrediting the military; her home was raided by police and she was detained for questioning. She was later released, after being ordered to spend the night at Moscow police headquarters. The next day, she was put under house arrest for two months, until 9 October 2022. However, on 1 October, her husband Igor announced that she had escaped house arrest together with her 11-year-old daughter. Her immediate whereabouts were unknown. On 17 October 2022, Ovsyannikova's lawyer confirmed she had fled Russia "to one of the European countries, where she is now under protection". On the same day, Ovsyannikova was restricted of parental rights on her 10 years old daughter and 17 years old son — the court ordered that Ovsyannikova's daughter must live with her father because her mother "is involved in political activity".

On 10 February 2023, Ovsyannikova gave a press conference in Paris, France, where she now resides, and described how she was assisted by Reporters Without Borders in fleeing the country. She was offered asylum by French president Emmanuel Macron after her on-air protest, and was at the time of her escape living in various safehouses in France. She detailed her journey out of Russia, which involved changing vehicles seven times, removing the electronic surveillance bracelet from her body, and crossing the border on foot. According to the Wall Street Journal, Ovsyannikova has said that she still fears for her life: "Each time I speak with my friends in Russia they ask me, 'What would you prefer, Novichok, polonium or a car crash?' ", referring to methods the FSB has allegedly used to assassinate critics living abroad.

Criticism 
News of Ovsyannikova being hired as a correspondent to cover the Russian invasion of Ukraine for Die Welt led to protests in Berlin by the Ukrainian community and war refugees. The protesters demanded that she be fired, but Die Welt refused to do so, saying that she is "on the right side of history". This decision sparked discussion in journalistic circles in Germany and other countries.

In Ukraine, Ovsyannikova is largely regarded as a propagandist of Russian official viewpoint. Her appearance on TV was ignored or held against her, and Ukrainian journalists were unhappy with her being awarded prizes. Her press conference in Kyiv in May 2022 was canceled due to the "uproar".

Personal life 
, Ovsyannikova lived in New Moscow (the former southwest sector of Moscow Oblast appended to Moscow in 2012) with her two children. She is married to Igor Ovsyannikov, a television director for RT. The couple were reported by one source in March 2022 as being "recently separated". She has relatives in Ukraine, but she does not have much contact with them.

See also
 2022 anti-war protests in Russia
 Mediazona – Russian human rights media outlet
 Vladimir Danchev – Russian newscaster who criticized the Soviet invasion of Afghanistan on live television in 1983
 Liz Wahl – Journalist for RT America who resigned on-air in 2014

Notes

References

Further reading

External links

 Guardian News' footage of the recording and the protest on set

1978 births
Living people
People from Odesa
Russian television journalists
Russian women journalists
Russian anti-war activists
Reactions to the 2022 Russian invasion of Ukraine
Russian activists against the 2022 Russian invasion of Ukraine
Russian women activists
Women television producers
Channel One Russia
Russian Presidential Academy of National Economy and Public Administration alumni
Kuban State University alumni
Russian people of Ukrainian descent
21st-century Russian journalists